This is a list of Members of Parliament (MPs) elected to the 3rd parliament in the reign of King James I in 1621.

The parliament began  on  30 January 1621 and was held to  27 March 1621. It met again on 17 April 1621 and was held to 4 June 1621. It met again on 14 November 1621  and was dissolved on 8 February 1622.

List of constituencies and members

 

 
 

 

 

 

 

 

In 1621 the constituencies of Pontefract and Ilchester  were re-enfranchised after the Committee of Privileges investigated abuses where the right of boroughs to return burgesses had fallen into disuse.

See also
List of parliaments of England

Notes

References
D. Brunton & D. H. Pennington, Members of the Long Parliament (London: George Allen & Unwin, 1954)
Cobbett's Parliamentary history of England, from the Norman Conquest in 1066 to the year 1803 (London: Thomas Hansard, 1808)

Parliaments of James I of England
1621 in England
1621 in politics
1621